Smug may refer to:

 Smug, an administrative district in Poland
 Sexual Minorities Uganda, an organisation in Uganda
 Smug Alert!, an episode in the television series South Park
 SMUG1, an enzyme

See also
 Smuga, a geographic area in Poland
 Smugi (disambiguation), other districts in Poland